Maria Sanchez was the defending champion, having won the event in 2012, but she lost to Ivana Lisjak in the second round.

Mayo Hibi won the title, defeating Madison Brengle in the final, 7–5, 6–0.

Seeds

Main draw

Finals

Top half

Bottom half

References 
 Main draw

FSP Gold River Women's Challenger - Singles
FSP Gold River Women's Challenger